Adeline Dutton Train Whitney (pen name, A. D. T. Whitney; September 15, 1824 – March 20, 1906) was an American poet and prolific writer, who published more than 20 books for girls. Her books expressed a traditional view of women's roles and were popular throughout her life.

Her first venture was a Book of Rhymes. Then followed: Mother Goose for Grown Folks, Boys at Chequassett, Faith Gartney's Girlhood, Hitherto — a Story of Yesterday, Prince Strong's Outings, The Gayworthys, Leslie Goldthwaite, We Girls, Holy Tides, Real Folks, The Other Girls, Sights and Insights, Odd and Even, Bannyborough Whiten Memories, Daffodils, Pansies, Homespun Yarns, Ascutney Street, A Golden Gossip, Bird Talk, and Just How.

Early life and education
Adeline Dutton Train was born in Boston, Massachusetts, September 15, 1824. She was the daughter of Enoch Train and Adeline Train (née Dutton). With his cousin, Samuel Train of Medford, Enoch did an extensive mercantile business, owning vessels, and trading to Russia and South America. In later years, he established his line of packet ships between Boston and Liverpool, thereafter known as the "Warren Line". George Francis Train, a founder of the Union Pacific Railroad, was her cousin.

When she was thirteen, her mother presented Whitney with a complete set of the stories of Maria Edgeworth, and gave her unlimited permission to read them. The result was twofold: first, the girl was preserved from reading a great deal of ordinary writing, and secondly, her thoughts were formed and guided by their influence, so that ordinary writing became distasteful to her.

Most of Whitney's more mature education was conducted in Boston. She was mainly the outcome of the culture, intellectual and moral, of that city. Like many other Boston girls, Whitney was educated in the school of George B. Emerson, from the age of thirteen through eighteen, from 1837 to 1842, with the exception of one year spent at Northampton, under the care of Margarette Dwight. Emerson was a Unitarian; Dwight was a Calvinist. In those days, there was an excited controversial division between the Unitarian and the Orthodox. Of this she said:— "After what has been said, incidentally, concerning alternating religious training and influences, I may suitably say that the result of all has been that I have recently connected myself with the church of the 'Apostles' Creed,' finding there the germ and foundation of all that has either broadened or narrowed from it; and am content to rest in that body which recognizes 'the blessed company of all faithful people,'—claiming the right to interpret those words with all the liberalism which they imply."

In the church and Sunday school of Dr. Lyman Beecher, and his successor, Hubbard Winslow, she received her first religious impressions. Afterwards, on her father's second marriage with a woman who belonged to the Unitarian church, the family changed their connection, under the care of Dr. Lowell. "Here," she says, "I found a somewhat different, though not antagonistic teaching, for those were the early days when there was still a simple faith, even among those who had unbound it from the Puritan rigidity. To Dr. Lowell, Dr. Bartol, and Mrs. Bartol, who as Miss Howard, was my Sunday-school teacher, I owe the beginning of my most earnest thinking."

Career

On November 7, 1843, she married Seth Dunbar Whitney, a wealthy merchant of Milton, who was twenty years older than herself. They lived in Milton, where they raised their family. For many years her household obligations prevented her from devoting time to her literary work, apart from an occasional article to a religious journal.

Whitney started writing seriously in her thirties, after her children started school. She first published poems and stories in local journals. Her first writing appeared in the Religious Magazine, published by Bishop Frederic Dan Huntington. In the winter of 1859, Rudd & Carleton published for her Mother Goose for Grown Folks, a little jeu d'esprit, for Christmas.

In 1861, she wrote Boys at Chequasset, for which, probably, her own son furnished material. In June, 1862, came out Faith Gartney's Girlhood. Both these books were issued by Loring in Boston, and had an immediate success. In 1864, came out under the same publisher The Gayworthys, published simultaneously in England, by Sampson, Low, Son & Co. In 1866, she issued as a serial in Our Young Folks, "A Summer in Leslie Goldthwaite's Life"; this was published the same year by Fields, Osgood & Co. In the space from 1868 to 1870, she wrote as a serial in the Christian Register, " Patience Strong's Outings," which was published by Loring. She also furnished a serial called "We Girls" to Our Young Folks, which was published in book form by Fields, Osgood & Co. In 1869, she published Hitherto, which appeared simultaneously in England, Whitney securing copyright by being in Montreal at the time of publication.

To these followed Real Folks and The Other Girls, published by Osgood & Co., in 1872–73. After this followed Sights and Insights, detailing the experiences of a party travelling in Europe. In the winter of 1877, Whitney compiled a cookbook entitled Just How, and in the spring of 1879, she published her story entitled Odd or Even with the firm of Osgood & Co. After the issue of Odd or Even, Messrs. Houghton & Osgood, having previously purchased of Loring the plates of all Whitney's other books, prepared a uniform edition of all her works. From time to time, Whitney published poetry in the Atlantic Monthly, or other papers; these were collected in a volume entitled "Pansies," published by Osgood & Co. in 1872.

The 1905, New International Encyclopedia expressed the opinion that with Hitherto (1869) "the period of her best work ends." Whitney also patented a set of alphabet blocks for children.

Personal life

Whitney privately opposed women's suffrage, and took no part in public life (in accordance with the traditional approach for women expressed in her books). Her daughter, Caroline Leslie Field, published prose and verse. She was known to the reading public through her contributions to periodicals. Whitney died in Milton at the age of 81.

Style and themes
Whitney wrote mainly for young girls and supported conservative values. She promoted the message of the era that a woman's happiest place is in the home, the source of all goodness. As this was popular among parents, her books sold extremely well throughout her life.

In the Apostles' Creed, on which Whitney found rest, is the article "I believe in the communion of saints," and Whitney, in this poem, expressed the idea of the primitive church, of a living, unbroken sympathy between their departed friends and themselves. They believed that in the services of the church their beloved ones once more drew near to them, and as in family prayers, the whole family in heaven and on earth united.

The most suggestive and comprehensive of Whitney's stories is The Other Girls. In her other stories, she has given amiable, sprightly, interesting young people, growing up under circumstances of ease and comfort, with means for a free, unembarrassed development. But in The Other Girls, we have life questions as they present themselves to those to whom life is a perplexity and a battle, and in this field, Whitney has the advantage of a heart full of motherly sympathy. There is no innocent natural feeling of the young female heart for which she has not kindly comprehension and tolerance. In Whitney's stories, we find the tenderest motherly sympathy for this natural feeling of the young girl's heart. Some of the prettiest pages of The Other Girls are given to a description of the raptures and tremors of the beautiful young country girl, Bel Bree, when acting as a lay figure in trying on an exquisite dress which she and her aunt were making up for a customer. Then there is a suggestion of an admiring male spectator, lodging in the same house, who catches through the half-open door a glimpse of all this loveliness. So far there has been only sympathy with young girlhood, but when the story goes on to show how this same admirer, Morris Hewland, captivated by the girl's loveliness, yet unwilling to offend his aristocratic relations, offers her protection and support without marriage, Whitney makes Bel Bree show resistance. She goes to Aunt Blin's Bible for guidance. In treating of the chances, mischances, fortunes, and misfortunes of The Other Girls, Whitney strikes directly across the much-mooted "woman question" of that day, and here she takes her stand firmly on the ground that family life and the creation of home and its influences is the first duty and the greatest glory of woman. She gives the instance of a young girl who, on the strength of her youthful prettiness, and a lesson or two in elocution, chooses to try the life of a platform reader, and shows the dangers that beset such a course: its interference with womanly duties and family ties, and the slightness of the advantages it brings compared with those which are sacrificed. In contrast come ever so many pretty scenes, as, for instance, when Bel Bree and Kate Senserbo go to live as "help" in a charming young family, where there is mutual appreciativeness and mutual care on the part both of employer and employed.

Selected works

1857: "Footsteps on the Seas" (poem)
1859: Mother Goose for Grown Folks (new editions in 1870 and 1882)
1868: Boys at Chequasset
1863: Faith Gartney's Girlhood
1865: The Gayworthys
1866: A Summer in Leslie Goldthwaite's Life
1868: Patience Strong's Outings
1869: Hitherto
1870: We Girls
1871: Real Folks
1872: Pansies (poems)
1873: The Other Girls
1876: Sights and Insights
1878: Just How: A Key to the Cook Books
1880: Odd or Even
1885: Bonnyborough
1886: Homespun Yarns
1886: Holy Tides
1887: Daffodils
1888: Bird Talk
1890: Ascutney Street
1891: A Golden Gossip
1894: Square Pegs
1896: Friendly Letters to Girl Friends
1897: The Open Mystery: A Reading of the Mosaic Story
1900: The Integrity of Christian Science

References

Citations

Bibliography

External links

Selected Poetry of Adeline Dutton Train Whitney (1824–1906) — Representative Poetry Online

1824 births
1906 deaths
19th-century American poets
19th-century American women writers
American children's writers
American women poets
People from Milton, Massachusetts
Poets from Massachusetts
Whitney family
Writers from Boston